The 1st Directors Guild of America Awards, honoring the outstanding directorial achievements in film in 1948, were presented in 1949.

Winners and nominees

Film

Special awards

External links
 

Directors Guild of America Awards
1948 film awards
1948 television awards
1948 in American cinema
1948 in American television